Various definitions exist for a service animal. The Americans with Disabilities Act defines the term as "dogs that are individually trained to do work or perform tasks for people with disabilities". Dogs are the most common service animals, having assisted people since at least 1927.

Regulations regarding service animals vary by region. For example, in Japan, regulations outline standards of training and certification for service animals. In the United States, service animals are generally allowed in areas of public accommodation, even where pets are generally forbidden. Other laws like the US Fair Housing Act and the US Air Carrier Access Act recognize the role of an animal in assisting a disabled owner. Various laws and policies may define "service animal" more expansively, but often do not recognize or specially accommodate emotional support animals.

Definitions
The international assistance animal community has categorized three types of assistance animals:
 Guide animals, which guide the blind;
 Hearing animals, which signal the hearing impaired; and
 Service animals, which do work for persons with disabilities other than blindness or deafness.

In the United States, the term "service animal" encompasses all three of the above types (guide dog, hearing animal, service dog).
Additionally, the Air Carrier Access Act breaks down the term service animal into emotional support animals, which includes psychiatric service animals, and other service animals. Airlines are permitted to require different and more extensive documentation for ESAs than for other service animals.

Service Animal Laws

Americans with Disability Act 
The ADA (Americans with Disabilities Act of 1990) in the United States defines a service animal as "a dog that is individually trained to do work or perform tasks for an individual with a disability." Emotional support animals do not qualify as service animals under the ADA. 

From the year it became active, that is, 1990, ADA inhibits any kind of discrimination against disabled Individuals. Although even before this, the Fair Housing section of the Civil Rights Act of 1964 also protects disabled individuals, the ADA solely focuses on discrimination based on disability.  The scope of the American Disabilities Act is vast as it not only inhibits discrimination by the housing authorities but also covers the areas related to employment, transportation, education, etc. 

There are different authorities that keep checking that ADA is wholly followed in the United States. For example, the U.S. Equal Employment Opportunity Commission (EEOC) ensures that there is no discrimination against disabled employees in the country. Whereas the Department of Transportation, with its full potential, makes sure that public vehicles and related services are comfortable for disabled individuals.

No state, local government, business, enterprise, or non-profit organization can discriminate against disabled individuals or deny their request to keep their service animals with them.

Federal Fair Housing Act 
In 1988, the Federal Fair Housing Amendment Act illegalized discrimination against individuals based on their disability. For that very reason, the housing authorities are obliged to approve the reasonable accommodation request of the disabled individuals, considering the reasonable accommodation helps the disabled tenant enjoy the dwelling as much as a non-disabled individual. The reasonable accommodation is more of a change, adjustment, or exception to ongoing policy only for individuals with a disability.

Following this, a disabled individual can demand a reasonable accommodation request for an assistance animal. The assistance animal can be a trained service animal or Emotional Support Animal. 

No matter the breed, type, size, or weight of these Assistance Animals, the landlord has to allow them in the housing even if they follow a no-pet policy. In accordance with this Fair Housing Act, the Landlords cannot ask for any extra charges for allowing both Service Animal and Emotional Support Animals in the rental housing.

Basically, the Leasing agents, Individuals selling their homes, Financial institutions, Real estate agents, Rental managers, Contractors, developers, etc., that are either selling or leasing a housing property are obliged to follow the Fair Housing Act. If any of these forbid this law, they are answerable to the US Department of Housing and Urban Development (HUD.)

Role of a service animal 

The people that can qualify for a service animal can have a range of physical and/or mental disabilities.

A guide animal is an animal specifically trained to assist visually impaired persons to navigate in public. These animals may be trained to open doors, recognize traffic signals, guide their owners safely across public streets, and navigate through crowds of people. A mobility animal may perform similar services for a person with physical disabilities, as well as assisting with balance or falling issues. Hearing animals are trained to assist hearing-impaired or deaf persons. These animals may be trained to respond to doorbells or a ringing phone or to tug their owners toward a person who is speaking to them. Psychiatric animals can be trained to provide deep-pressure therapy by lying on top of a person who may be experiencing PTSD flashbacks, overstimulation, or acute anxiety. Similarly, autism animals have been recently introduced to recognize and respond to the needs of people with autism spectrum disorder; some persons with ASD state that they are more comfortable interacting with animals than with human caregivers due to issues regarding eye contact, touch, and socialization. Medical emergency animals can assist in medical emergency and perform such services as clearing an area in the event of a grand mal seizure, fetching medication or other necessary items, alerting others in the event of a medical episode; some may even be trained to call emergency services through use of a telephone with specially designed oversized buttons. Service animals may also be trained to alert persons to the presence of an allergen.

The animals also provide important companionship and emotional support for owners who might otherwise be isolated due to disability. It is important to note, however, that providing "important companionship and emotional support for owners" is not a task that would qualify an animal as a service animal. In the US, it is illegal to bring an animal to non-pet friendly places simply because it provides companionship or emotional support. Additionally, saying your animal is a service animal for such reasons is illegal. The owners in turn often derive a sense of accomplishment and importance from attending to the needs of their animals.

Access by region
Despite regulations or rules that deny access to animals in restaurants and other public places, in many countries, guide dogs, other types of assistance dogs, and in cases miniature horses, are protected by law, and therefore may accompany their handlers in most places that are open to the public. Laws and regulations vary per jurisdiction.

United States
In the United States, the Americans with Disabilities Act of 1990 prohibits any business, government agency, or other organization that provides access to the general public from barring guide dogs. However, religious organizations are not required to provide such access. Current federal regulations define "service animal" for ADA purposes to exclude all species of animals other than domestic dogs and miniature horses. Other laws, though, still provide broader definitions in other areas. For instance, the Department of Transportation's regulations enacting the Air Carrier Access Act permit "dogs and other service animals" to accompany passengers on commercial airlines. However, since December 2020 the U.S. Department of Transportation does not include emotional support animals in the definition of service animals in the Air Carrier Access Act. The Fair Housing Act requires housing providers to permit service animals (including comfort and emotional support animals) without species restrictions in housing.

The revised Americans with Disabilities Act of 1990 requirements are as follows: "Beginning on March 15, 2011, only dogs are recognized as service animals under titles II and III of the ADA. A service animal is a dog that is individually trained to do work or perform tasks for a person with a disability. Generally, title II and title III entities must permit service animals to accompany people with disabilities in all areas where members of the public are allowed to go. In addition to the provisions about service dogs, the Department's revised ADA regulations have a new, separate provision about miniature horses that have been individually trained to do work or perform tasks for people with disabilities. (Miniature horses generally range in height from 24 inches to 34 inches measured to the shoulders and generally weigh between 70 and 100 pounds.) Entities covered by the ADA must modify their policies to permit miniature horses where reasonable. The regulations set out four assessment factors to assist entities in determining whether miniature horses can be accommodated in their facility. The assessment factors are (1) whether the miniature horse is housebroken; (2) whether the miniature horse is under the owner's control; (3) whether the facility can accommodate the miniature horse's type, size, and weight; and (4) whether the miniature horse's presence will not compromise legitimate safety requirements necessary for safe operation of the facility."

However, businesses may exclude service animals when the animals' presence or behavior "fundamentally alters" the nature of the goods, services, programs, or activities provided to the public. The ADA states that a service animal may only be removed from the premises if the dog is out of control of the handler or the dog is not housebroken. Service animals are to be kept under control by wearing a leash, harness, or tether unless it would interfere with the animal's ability to perform its tasks. Housebroken means the service animal to be adequately trained to go outside to urinate and defecate. This could include exclusion from certain areas of zoos where a dog's presence could disrupt the animals' behavior or where there is open access to the animals, or if a service dog's alert behavior is barking, its behavior could be considered fundamentally altering the service provided by a movie theater.

Staff are legally allowed to ask the following questions about service animals: (1) "Is the dog a service animal required because of a disability?" and (2) "What work or task has this animal been trained to perform?" Staff cannot request documentation, ask about the handler's disability, or require the animal to perform its tasks.

Other rules relating to service dogs outlined by the ADA:

 Staff cannot deny service for reasons such as allergies or fear of dogs
 Staff cannot charge handlers extra fees because of a service animal
 Hotels must provide handlers the ability to reserve any room, not just rooms deemed "pet-friendly"
 Staff are not responsible for supervising a service animal
 Dog may be of any breed

Other regions
In most South American countries and Mexico, guide dog access depends solely upon the goodwill of the owner or manager. In more tourist-heavy areas, guide dogs are generally welcomed without problems. In Brazil, however, a 2006 federal decree requires allowance of guide dogs in all public and open to public places. The Federal District Metro has developed a program which trains guide dogs to ride it.
In Europe, the situation varies by location. Some countries have laws that govern the entire country and sometimes the decision is left up to the respective regions.
In Australia, the Disability Discrimination Act 1992 protects all assistance dog handlers. Current laws may not ensure that assistance dog users can always have their service animals present in all situations. Each state and territory has its own laws, which mainly pertain to guide dogs. Queensland has introduced the Guide Hearing and Assistance Dog Act 2009 that covers all certified assistance dogs. 
In Canada, guide dogs along with other service animals are allowed anywhere that the general public is allowed, as long as the owner is in control of them. Fines for denying a service animal access can be up to $3000 in Alberta, Canada. There are separate laws for service dogs in Alberta, British Columbia, Nova Scotia, and Ontario.
In South Korea, it is illegal to deny access to guide dogs in any areas that are open to the public. Violators are fined for no more than 2 million won.
In Japan, the Act on Assistance Dogs for Physically Disabled Persons was issued in 2002. The stated goal of this act was to improve the quality of "assistance dogs for physically disabled persons" and expand the use of public facilities by physically disabled people. Assistance dogs are classified as either guide dogs, hearing dogs, or service dogs. Public transportation, public facilities, offices of public organisation, and private businesses of 50 or more people are required to accept assistance dogs. Private housing and private businesses with less than 50 people are encouraged but not required to accept assistance dogs.

Animals for individual assistance
Many service animals may be trained to perform tasks to help their disabled partners live independent lives. Such animals include:
 Seizure sensing dogs, trained to sense epileptic seizures in their partner. Dogs can support a litany of both physical and mental disabilities.
 Capuchin monkeys, which can be trained to perform manual tasks such as grasping items, operating knobs and switches, and turning the pages of a book.

Miniature horse
A miniature horse can be trained to guide the blind, to pull wheelchairs, or as support for persons with Parkinson's disease.

A full-grown miniature horse can vary from 26" to 38". There are two main registering organisations. The American Miniature Horse Association limits height to 34" whereas the American Miniature Horse Registry has a division for horses 34" to 38".

There are a number of advantages of miniature horses as service animals. Miniature horses may be chosen by people whose religion considers dogs to be unclean or who have serious allergies to dogs, as well as phobias. Miniature horses have average lifespans of 30–40 years (longer than those of both service dogs and monkeys) and take 6 months to a year of training, done only by professional trainers.

Guide horse users report they typically are immediately recognised as a working service animal, whereas a dog may be mistaken for a pet. Miniature horses have been praised for their excellent range of vision (350 degrees), good memories, calm nature, focused demeanor, and good cost-effectiveness.

Helper monkey

A helper monkey is a type of assistance animal, that is specially trained to help people with quadriplegia, severe spinal cord injuries, or other mobility impairments, similar to a mobility assistance dog.

Helper monkeys are usually trained in schools by private organisations, taking seven years to train, and are able to serve 25–30 years (two to three times longer than a guide dog).

After being socialised in a human home as infants, the monkeys undergo extensive training before being placed with an individual needing assistance. Around the house, the monkeys assist in daily living by doing tasks including microwaving food, washing their human's face, and opening drink bottles.

In 2010, the U.S. federal government revised its definition of service animal under the Americans with Disabilities Act (ADA). Non-human primates are no longer recognised as service animals under the ADA. The American Veterinary Medical Association does not support the use of non-human primates as assistance animals because of animal welfare concerns, the potential for serious injury to people, and risks that primates may transfer dangerous diseases to humans.

See also
 Service dog
 Emotional support animal—an animal that makes the owner feel better emotionally
 Animal-assisted therapy—therapy that uses contact with animals to improve a patient's social, emotional, or cognitive functioning
 Working animal—an animal that is trained to engage in productive tasks
 Guide horse—assistance animal to blind users

References

Further reading
 Moorehead, Daniel. Animals in Human Society: Amazing Creatures Who Share Our Planet. Lanham, UP of America, 2015.

External links
 Disabilities and Medical Conditions - TSA (Transport Security Administration)
 "Creature Comforts" from the New York Times
 Capuchin monkey helpers - MSNBC
}
 Americans with Disabilities Act resources
 Guide Horse Foundation
 The Miniature Horse as a Service Animal

Assistance dogs
 Service animal
Working animals